Pipestone Public Library in Pipestone, Minnesota, United States, is a Carnegie library that was built in 1904.  It was an important work of architect Joseph Schwartz.  It was listed on the U.S. National Register of Historic Places in 1980.

The building is made of Sioux quartzite.

References

External links
Placeography: Pipestone Public Library
National Register of Historic Places Travel Itinerary: Pipestone, Minnesota

Library buildings completed in 1904
Buildings and structures in Pipestone County, Minnesota
Carnegie libraries in Minnesota
Libraries on the National Register of Historic Places in Minnesota
National Register of Historic Places in Pipestone County, Minnesota
1904 establishments in Minnesota